Christian Negouai (born 20 January 1978) is a French former professional footballer who played for as a midfielder.

He notably played in the Premier League for Manchester City and spent a spell on loan with Coventry City. He also played in Belgium with UR Namur, Charleroi and Standard Liège, FC Brussels and with Aalesund in Norway.

Career
Negouai was bought for £1.5 million by Manchester City from Charleroi in 2001. He made six league appearances of which two were match starts and scored once against Rotherham. He also appeared for Manchester City in the UEFA Cup scoring against The New Saints F.C. Negouai proved to be a versatile success for Manchester City Reserves in the Premier Reserve League, scoring nine goals in 19 games after being converted to a centre forward from a defensive midfielder although his time at Manchester City was hampered by a serious injury which required operations on both knees restricting his appearances. According to Duncan Alexander, as of January 2019 he remains the only player to be sent off on their one and only Premier League appearance.

Upon joining Standard Liège, Negouai scored the fastest goal in Belgian League history when he struck after just 11 seconds in a 2-0 win over KVC Westerlo.

Personal life
Negouai is a practising Muslim.

References

External links

Player profile at ZeroZero

Profile at Playerhistory.com

1978 births
Living people
Sportspeople from Fort-de-France
Martiniquais footballers
French footballers
French expatriate footballers
Expatriate footballers in England
Expatriate footballers in Belgium
Expatriate footballers in Norway
French expatriate sportspeople in England
French expatriate sportspeople in Belgium
French expatriate sportspeople in Norway
Association football midfielders
R. Charleroi S.C. players
Manchester City F.C. players
Coventry City F.C. players
Standard Liège players
Aalesunds FK players
R.W.D.M. Brussels F.C. players
Premier League players
English Football League players
Belgian Pro League players
French people of Martiniquais descent